Ko Kra is a group of small rocky islets in the southern area of the Gulf of Thailand. It is under the administration of Nakhon Si Thammarat Province of Thailand.

This islet group should not be confused with other islands of the same name: Ko Kra in Chumphon Province or Mu Ko Kra (หมู่เกาะกระ) a group of islets to the west of Ko Mak in Trat Province. There is also a place by the name of Ko-kra in Kayah State, mainland Myanmar.

Geography
Ko Kra, about 54 km from the nearest shore, consists of three islets: Ko Kra Yai, Ko Kra Klang, and Ko Kra Lek, as well as one small rocky outcrop, Hin Ko Kra. The area surrounding these islets is a good diving spot owing to its relative remoteness.

Territorial dispute
The Ko Kra group, although barren and uninhabited, is part of a territorial dispute along with the islet of Ko Losin.
The dispute over the continental shelf boundary between Malaysia and Thailand arises from the different baselines which the two countries adopt in calculating the equidistant line for boundary. Thailand's proclaimed baseline runs from the terminus at Kuala Tabar (the eastern terminus of the Malaysia-Thailand land border as defined by the Anglo-Siamese Treaty of 1909) northwards to Ko Losin islet and then northwestwards to Ko Kra. Malaysia however does not regard Ko Losin as a valid baseline point and calculates the equidistant line on a baseline running along the shore. India has shown support for the Thais, calling for an end to the dispute.

See also
 List of islands of Thailand
 Anglo-Siamese Treaty of 1909

References

External links
Vietnam’s First Maritime Boundary Agreement
  Limits in the Seas, No 122 Straight Baseline Claim: Thailand;  United States Department of State Bureau of Oceans and International Environmental and Scientific Affairs

Kra
Territorial disputes of Thailand
Territorial disputes of Malaysia
Malaysia–Thailand border
Uninhabited islands of Thailand
Islands of the Gulf of Thailand
Ramsar sites in Thailand